The Hudson Pacemaker is an automobile which was produced by the Hudson Motor Car Company in 1939 and for the 1950 through 1952 model years.

1939
The Pacemaker was introduced in March 1939 and is often considered to be the replacement for the Terraplane. It was built on a 118 inch wheelbase and powered by a 212 cubic inch six cylinder engine. The Pacemaker was not carried over into the 1940 Hudson range.

1950 to 1952
The Pacemaker was again offered for the 1950 through 1952 model years. It was the cheapest model in the Hudson range in each of the three years. The Pacemaker utilised a 119 inch wheelbase, five inches shorter than that used for all other contemporary Hudson models.  The Pacemaker had the flathead 232 cubic inch 6-cylinder engine. The Wasp debuted in 1952 with the 262 six, but when the Pacemaker was discontinued, the 1953-54 Wasp base engine became the Pacemaker's 232. The 262-equipped Wasp models were designated Super Wasp.

References

External links 

Pacemaker